MiQuale Maurice Lewis (born June 8, 1987) is a former college football running back at Ball State University Cardinals. As a junior, Lewis rushed for 1,701 yards and scored 22 touchdowns to help Ball State accumulate a 12-2 record and earn a berth in the 2009 GMAC Bowl.

College career
Lewis ran for 3,748 yards while a member of the Ball State Cardinals football team.

Professional career
Lewis decided to put his National Football League dreams on hold during the 2011 NFL Lockout.

See also
 List of college football yearly rushing leaders

References

External links
 Profile BallStateSports.com
 Statistics ESPN.com

1987 births
Living people
Ball State Cardinals football players
American football running backs